Hannah Dines (born 14 April 1993) is a British former T2 trike rider who competed at the 2016 Summer Paralympics.
 	
She competed in the 2015 UCI C1 Brixia Para-cycling Cup in Italy where she won a TT and road race in the T2 class.

References

External links 
 
 

1993 births
Living people
Sportspeople from Glasgow
Scottish female cyclists
Paralympic cyclists of Great Britain
Cyclists at the 2016 Summer Paralympics
Alumni of the University of Glasgow
Alumni of Manchester Metropolitan University